Worry stones are smooth, polished gemstones, usually in the shape of an oval with a thumb-sized indentation, used for relaxation or anxiety relief.  Worry stones are typically around 3 centimetres in size. They are used by holding the stone between the index finger and thumb and gently moving one's thumb back and forth across the stone. This action of moving one's thumb back and forth across the stone is thought to reduce stress.

Worry stones may also be called palm stones, thumb stones, fidget stones, soothing stones, or sensory stones.

History 
As a folk practice implement, worry stones have many origins. Variations on the concept originate in ancient Greece, Tibet, Ireland, and multiple Native American tribes. The concept of a  worry stone began by the simple action of picking a smooth stone and fiddling with the stone. Worry stones made by sea water were generally used by Ancient Greeks. The smoothness of the stone was most often created naturally by running water.

Usage 

From the perspective of cognitive behavior therapy, the use of worry stones is one of many folk practices that can function as psychologically healthy self-soothing exercises. Such techniques are imparted at an early stage of treatment, displacing any familiar but destructive coping methods (nail-biting, scratching, lip-biting, etc.) that the patient may have developed. This helps ready the patient to safely confront anxiety or trauma. Worry stones are simple and intuitive enough to be useful in therapeutic contexts where complexity and unfamiliarity are paramount concerns, such as when offering short-term treatment to refugees.  After a patient has mastered a more sophisticated relaxation script for anxiety management, the worry stone itself can serve as a physical 'relaxation script reminder'; the patient may notice an impulse to use the object, and thereby become aware of their own anxiety.

See also
 Fidget Cube
 Fidget spinner
 Kombolói – Greek worry beads
 Mood ring
 Stress ball

References

Ancient Greek culture
Gemstones
Stress (biological and psychological)